Mangur-e Gharbi Rural District is in the Central District of Piranshahr County, West Azerbaijan province, Iran. At the National Census of 2006, its population was 9,120 in 1,330 households. There were 8,999 inhabitants in 1,885 households at the following census of 2011. At the most recent census of 2016, the population of the rural district was 9,090 in 1,953 households. The largest of its 49 villages was Kuper, with 958 people.

References 

Piranshahr County

Rural Districts of West Azerbaijan Province

Populated places in West Azerbaijan Province

Populated places in Piranshahr County